Adrian Costa (born 2 June 1972) is an Australian freestyle skier, who represented Australia in four Winter Olympics in 1992, 1994, 1998 and 2002.

He competed in the men's moguls and placed 14th out of 47 in 1992. He came 14th out of 29 in 1994 and 21st of 30 in 1998. In his swansong in 2002, he came 18th out of 30.

References

External links
 
 
 

1972 births
Living people
Australian male freestyle skiers
Olympic freestyle skiers of Australia
Freestyle skiers at the 1992 Winter Olympics
Freestyle skiers at the 1994 Winter Olympics
Freestyle skiers at the 1998 Winter Olympics
Freestyle skiers at the 2002 Winter Olympics